The Hochschule Düsseldorf is a Fachhochschule (University of Applied Sciences) with departments for social sciences and cultural studies, technical sciences, architecture, media, design and business education in Düsseldorf.
Its foundation was in 1971. It is the second largest University of Applied Sciences in North Rhine-Westphalia, after the Technical University of Cologne.

On 1 Mai 2015 the name was changed from Fachhochschule Düsseldorf to Hochschule Düsseldorf.

List of Departments
Dept. 1 – Architecture
Dept. 2 – Design
Dept. 3 – Electrical Engineering
Dept. 4 – Mechanical and Process Engineering
Dept. 5 – Media
Dept. 6 – Social Sciences and Cultural Studies
Dept. 7 – Business Studies
Dept. 8 – Education

External links

References

Dusseldorf
Education in Düsseldorf
Universities of Applied Sciences in Germany